Maria Francesca Rossetti (17 February 1827 – 24 November 1876) was a London-born English author and nun. She was the sister of artist Dante Gabriel Rossetti and William Michael Rossetti, and of Christina Georgina Rossetti, who dedicated her 1862 poem Goblin Market to Maria.

Literary and religious life
She was the author of The Shadow of Dante: Being an essay towards studying himself, his world, and his pilgrimage (published 1871). She also acted as a governess during the years of family hardship brought on by her father's failing health, and tutored a young Lucy Madox Brown, a future sister-in-law.

At the age of 46, Maria joined the Society of All Saints, an Anglican order for women. Lucy Madox Brown wanted to paint her in her habit. She made an English translation of the Monastic Diurnal for her order, The Day Hours and Other Offices as Used by the Sisters of All Saints, which was used by her order until 1922. She, along with her sister Christina, donated her time to the St. Mary Magdalene Home for Fallen Women in Highgate. She unsuccessfully attempted to convert her agnostic brothers on her death bed.

Personal life
Her siblings teased her about her plain appearance, nicknaming her 'Moony' for her rounded face. Maria never married. She was a friend of John Ruskin, having visited his home at Denmark Hill, and at 28 she developed romantic feelings for him after his marriage was annulled.

Death
Maria died of ovarian cancer in 1876, despite drawn-out treatments to try to drain the tumour. She was buried in the convent plot at Brompton Cemetery.

Works

Maria Francesca Rossetti, A Shadow of Dante: being an essay towards studying himself, his world and his pilgrimage, Rivingtons, London, 1871,  edition Hathi Trust Digital Library
Maria Francesca Rossetti, Exercises in idiomatic Italian through literal translation from the English, Williams and Norgate, London 1867,  edition Internet Archive
Maria Francesca Rossetti, Aneddoti italiani: Italian anecdotes, selected from Il compagno del passeggio Campestre, Williams and Norgate, London 1867,  edition Internet Archive
Maria Francesca Rossetti, Letters to My Bible Class on Thirty-nine Sundays, Nabu Press A, 2011,  
Maria Francesca Rossetti, The rivulets; a dream not all a dream, A. Dod, London, 1846, OCLC 42216558 
Maria Francesca Rossetti, Dante's Pilgrimage Through Hell, Kessinger Publishing, LLC, 2005, 
Maria Francesca Rossetti, Dante's Pilgrimage Through Purgatory, Kessinger Publishing, LLC, 2005, 
Maria Francesca Rossetti, Dante's Pilgrimage Through Paradise, Kessinger Publishing, LLC, 2010, 
Maria Francesca Rossetti, Dante's Life Experience, Kessinger Publishing, LLC, 2010,

See also

References

Further reading
Susan Elkin, Rossetti, Maria Francesca (1827–1876), author and Anglican nun 
Jan Marsh, Pre-Raphaelite Sisterhood, (London: Quartet, 1985)
Dinah Roe, The Rossettis in Wonderland. A Victorian Family History (London: Haus Publishing, 2011), 

1827 births
1876 deaths
English people of Italian descent
Polidori-Rossetti family
Writers from London
English literary critics
Women literary critics
English Anglicans
Burials at Brompton Cemetery
Victorian women writers
Victorian writers
19th-century English non-fiction writers
19th-century British women writers
19th-century British journalists
Rossetti family